Ectoedemia weaveri is a moth of the  family Nepticulidae. It is found from Fennoscandia and northern Russia to the Pyrenees and Italy, and from Great Britain through Russia (Baikal, Chita, Yakutia and Magadan regions in eastern Siberia) to Hokkaido in Japan.

The wingspan is about 7 mm. Adults are on wing from April to August in western Europe.

The larvae feed on Vaccinium vitis-idaea. They mine the leaves of their host plant. The mine consists of a long corridor, with the frass concentrated in a broad central line, leaving a clear margin at either side. The gallery widens into a large full depth blotch, with a central concentration of frass. The full-grown larva makes an exit slit in the lower epidermis and spins an orange-yellow cocoon within the mine, that is connected to the exit by a silken tunnel. The cocoon causes a blister-like wound on the leaf.

External links
Fauna Europaea
Nepticulidae from the Volga and Ural region
bladmineerders.nl
UKmoths

Nepticulidae
Moths of Asia
Moths of Europe
Moths described in 1855